Radziejów may refer to the following places:
Radziejów in Kuyavian-Pomeranian Voivodeship (north-central Poland)
Radziejów, Lublin Voivodeship (east Poland)
Radziejów, Opole Voivodeship (south-west Poland)